The year 1983 in archaeology involved some significant events.

Explorations
 Laconia Survey begins (joint British–Dutch project); continues to 1989.

Excavations
 Mausoleum of the Nanyue King, Zhao Mo, Emperor Wen of Nanyue (d. 122 BCE), discovered under Elephant Hill in Guangzhou, China, and excavation by Mai Yinghao and Huang Zhanyue begins.
 Tell Qarqur in Syria, by an American team, is begun.
 Hengistbury Head, by Barry Cunliffe, is continued (begun in 1979).
 Boxgrove Quarry, by Mark Roberts of University College London, is begun (continues to 1996).
 Excavation of the Sima de los Huesos (Pit of Bones) at the archaeological site of Atapuerca in northern Spain begins.
 Abric Romani cave near Capellades in Catalonia is begun.

Publications
 Christopher Chippindale - Stonehenge Complete.
 R. C. Gaur - Excavations at Atranjikhera: early civilization of the Upper Ganga Basin.

Finds
 May 13 - Lindow Woman discovered at Lindow Moss in north west England by peat cutters.
 First Ayn Ghazal statues found in Jordan.
 Zhangjiashan Han bamboo texts, including the Book on Numbers and Computation, from tomb M247 at Mount Zhangjia in central China.
 Kitora Tomb discovered at Asuka, Nara, Japan.
 16th century turkey bones in Exeter, England, subsequently identified as from one of the earliest of the birds in Britain.
 Gloucester tabula set in England.
 A multi-tablet collection of literature in the Hurrian language with a Hittite translation is discovered at Hattusa in Turkey.

Events
 British Committee for the Reunification of the Parthenon Marbles is formed.

Births

Deaths
Joan du Plat Taylor, British pioneer of maritime archaeology (b. 1906)

References

Archaeology
Archaeology
Archaeology by year